Qarah Aghajlu may refer to:
 Qarah Aghajlu, Ardabil
 Qarah Aghajlu-ye Bala, Ardabil Province
 Qarah Aghajlu-ye Pain, Ardabil Province
 Qarah Aghajlu, West Azerbaijan